Actinodaphne pruinosa is a species of plant in the family Lauraceae. It is a tree found in Peninsular Malaysia and Singapore.

References

pruinosa
Trees of Malaya
Least concern plants
Taxonomy articles created by Polbot